The Flathead Forest Reserve was established in Montana by the General Land Office on February 22, 1897, with .  On June 9, 1903, it was combined with the Lewis and Clarke Forest Reserve  and its name was discontinued.

The reserve area is approximately 2,160 square miles including the reserve and a tract of country extending to the west as far as Tobacco Plains. The area which lies entirely north of the Great Northern Railway consists in general terms of two mountain ranges, one in the eastern the other in the western part of the reserve separated by a broad valley. The easternmost of the two ranges is the eastern range of the Rocky Mountain system in this latitude facing the plains. Its peaks have an altitude in the neighborhood of the railroad of from 7,000 to 9,000 feet rising northward so that at the northern boundary of the country they reach an altitude of 11,000 feet. All the gorges leading out of this range are of glacial origin and in the upper parts of these gorges glaciers still remain covering a large part of the region with snow and ice. It is an extremely rugged range abounding in points of great scenic interest. East of this range is the valley of Flathead River above the Flathead Lake which in the south has a width of about 15 miles narrowing northward toward the boundary. Succeeding the Flathead Valley on the west is a broken irregular mountain range not as high nor as rugged as the eastern range. Most of this region is drained southward by the Flathead River into Flathead Lake. Smaller portions are drained by the Kootenai, Saskatchewan and Missouri rivers.

Taken as a whole the region is one of fairly abundant rainfall although as it has a wide range in altitude; the rainfall differs greatly in different parts. In the valleys irrigation is probably advisable if not necessary while upon the mountains the rainfall is ample for tree growth. Owing to the latitude and the elevation the temperature is low rendering it doubtful whether agriculture can ever be made profitable within it. The region is generally lightly timbered. This is not due to the climate, which is not unfavorable to tree growth, but to frequent and persistent fires. The merchantable timber in the reserve consists mainly of western larch, red fir, spruce and yellow pine. The entire stand of timber within the reserve estimating it upon the basis of the present practice in cutting is only 300 million feet. Measuring it, however, by Eastern standards it is found to contain 851 million feet and, in addition to that, 3,628,000 cords of wood suitable for firewood. This amount stands upon an area of 1,942 square miles leaving only 218 square miles reported as not timbered. It is plain from the above that this reserve cannot be regarded as an important source of timber at present but rather as a region for the cultivation of timber for future use. The probabilities of agriculture in this region are somewhat doubtful, owing to the severity of the climate. There were numerous gold mining claims being operated in the reserve in the late 1890s, although little mining has been conducted in modern times.

The lands are presently part of Lewis and Clark National Forest and the re-established Flathead National Forest.

See also
 List of forests in Montana

References

External links
Lewis and Clark National Forest
Forest History Society
Forest History Society:Listing of the National Forests of the United States Text from Davis, Richard C., ed. Encyclopedia of American Forest and Conservation History. New York: Macmillan Publishing Company for the Forest History Society, 1983. Vol. II, pp. 743-788.

Former National Forests of Montana
1897 establishments in Montana
Defunct forest reserves of the United States